Žerotín is a municipality and village in Olomouc District in the Olomouc Region of the Czech Republic. It has about 400 inhabitants.

History
The first written mention of Žerotín is in a deed of bishop Jindřich Zdík from 1141. Its history is connected with the noble Zierotin family that got its name from the village. The Zierotins owned Žerotín until the 15th century. The next 300 years it was owned by the Augustinian monastery in Šternberk.

References

Villages in Olomouc District